Gauselmann is a German gaming and gambling company founded by Paul Gauselmann.

In autumn 2012, it acquired the British company Praesepe, headed by Nick Harding.

References

Online gambling companies of Germany
Gambling in the United Kingdom